Remixes is a compilation of remixes by the French DJ SebastiAn. Featuring remixes made from 2005 to 2008, it was released on September 22, 2008 as a CD, a vinyl record, and digital download.

Cover art
As for any cover art on releases by Ed Banger Records, the design is coordinated by graphic designer So Me.

The CD version is edited in gatefold format, inserted in a red translucent plastic sleeve. The image depicts the drawing of the features of the artist's face in black. When the red sleeve is removed, it then reveals the real papercard cover, which, in addition to the face, features several drawings and commentaries about the album, written in red (and therefore not visible through the sleeve). Some of them include : "Do you think you can handle this?", "Is it a best of ? Well, yes somehow it's true", "Dancefloor fillers... also surprising pop reworks".

Track listing

References 

Ed Banger Records albums
Sebastian (French musician) albums
2008 remix albums
2008 compilation albums